The Play-offs of the 2010 Fed Cup Europe/Africa Zone Group I were the final stages of the Group I Zonal Competition involving teams from Europe and Africa. Using the positions determined in their pools, the sixteen teams faced off to determine their placing in the 2010 Fed Cup Europe/Africa Zone Group I. The top two teams advanced to World Group II play-offs, and the bottom two teams were relegated down to the Europe/Africa Zone Group II for the next year.

Promotion play-offs 
The first placed teams of each pool were placed against each other in two head-to-head rounds. The winner of the rounds advanced to the World Group II play-offs, where they would get a chance to advance to the World Group II for next year.

Slovenia vs. Switzerland

Sweden vs. Austria

Fifth to Seventh play-off
The second placed teams of each pool were placed against each other in two ties. The winner of each tie was allocated fifth place in the Group while the losers were allocated seventh.

Netherlands vs. Great Britain

Romania vs. Hungary

Ninth to Eleventh play-off
The third placed teams of each pool were placed against each other in two ties. The winner of each tie was allocated ninth place in the Group while the losers were allocated eleventh.

Israel vs. Denmark

Croatia vs. Belarus

Relegation play-offs
The last placed teams of each pool were placed against each other in two ties. The losing team of the rounds were relegated to Group II for next year.

Bulgaria vs. Portugal

Latvia vs. Bosnia and Herzegovina

Final placements 

  and  advanced to the World Group II play-offs. The Swedes were drawn against , and they won 3–2, which allowed them to advance to World Group II, while the Slovenians were drawn against  and won 4–1. They also thus advanced to World Group II for 2011.
They both placed first respectively in Pool A and Pool B, and also both won their Promotion play-off matches. The two teams thus advanced back to Group I for 2012.

References

External links 
 Fed Cup website

2010 Fed Cup Europe/Africa Zone